Troltrolhue or Cordillera Troltrolhue is a mountain and mountain range in Los Ríos Region, southern Chile. The mountain range runs from west to east across five communes; Mariquina, Lanco, Máfil, Los Lagos and Panguipulli. It lies south and east of Cruces River and west of Calafquén and Panguipulli lakes. Part of the southeastern slope of the mountain range is a fault scarp. There are historical placer-type gold mines in the Troltrolhue.

References

Mountains of Los Ríos Region